Don Miller or Donald Miller may refer to:

Politics
Don Miller (Tennessee politician) (born 1956), member of the Tennessee House of Representatives
Donald R. Miller (born 1966), member of the New York State Assembly

Sports
Don Miller (American football, born 1902) (1902–1979), member of the Four Horsemen of Notre Dame, the backfield of Notre Dame's 1924 football team
Don Miller (American football, born 1932), professional football player for the Green Bay Packers and Philadelphia Eagles
Don Miller (American football coach) (born c. 1933), head football coach at Trinity College in Hartford, Connecticut from 1967 to 1998
Donald Miller (cricketer) (born 1939), Jamaican cricketer
Donald Miller Jr. (born 1963), American horse racing jockey

Music
Don Miller (singer) (died 2021), American pop singer, founding member of the vocal group The Vogues
Donald Miller (guitarist), member of the band Borbetomagus

Other
Don Miller, producer of movies such as White Men Can't Jump
Don Miller, former president of Penske Racing
Don C. Miller, (born 1923), American engineer and amateur archeologist
Donald Miller (author) (born 1971), Christian author and public speaker
Donald H. Miller, Jr., one of the founders of Scientific American magazine
Donald L. Miller (born 1944), American historian
Donald E. Miller (born 1946), American theologian
Donald Gene Miller (born 1954), American serial killer

See also
J. Donald Millar, known as Don Millar, physician